Finland competed at the 1996 Summer Olympics in Atlanta, Georgia, United States. 76 competitors, 47 men and 29 women, took part in 74 events in 15 sports.

Medalists

Gold
 Heli Rantanen — Athletics, Women's Javelin Throw

Silver
 Jani Sievinen — Swimming, Men's 200 metres Individual Medley
 Marko Asell — Wrestling, Men's Greco-Roman Welterweight (74 kg)

Bronze
 Seppo Räty — Athletics, Men's Javelin Throw

Archery

The Finnish team sent only men to the 1996 archery tournament.  Each won his first match, while two were defeated in the second round.  Tomi Poikolainen was the only Finn to reach the third round, where he was defeated.  The squad won its first match in the team round, but was soundly defeated in the quarterfinal.

Men's Individual Competition:
 Tomi Poikolainen → Round of 16, 12th place (2-1)
 Jari Lipponen → Round of 32, 20th place (1-1)
 Tommi Tuovila → Round of 32, 32nd place (1-1)

Men's Team Competition:
 Poikolainen, Lipponen, and Tuovila → Quarterfinal, 8th place (1-1)

Athletics

Men's 110 metres Hurdles
Antti Haapakoski

Men's Marathon
 Harri Hänninen — 2:18.41 (→ 32nd place)
 Risto Ulmala — did not finish (→ no ranking)

Men's 50 km Walk
 Valentin Kononen — 3:47:40 (→ 7th place)
 Antero Lindman — 4:07:58 (→ 30th place)
 Jani Lehtinen — did not finish (→ no ranking)

Men's Pole Vault
Heikki Vääräniemi

Men's Shot Put
Mika Halvari
Arsi Harju

Men's Javelin Throw
Seppo Räty
Kimmo Kinnunen 
Harri Hakkarainen

Men's Hammer Throw 
 Marko Wahlman
 Qualification — 73.50m (→ did not advance)

Women's 100 metres
Sanna Kyllönen

Women's 200 metres
Sanna Kyllönen

Women's 10.000 metres 
 Annemari Sandell
 Qualification — 31:40.42 
 Final — 32:14.66 (→ 12th place)

Women's 4 × 100 m Relay
Johanna Manninen
Sanna Kyllönen
Heidi Suomi
Anu Pirttimaa

Women's Javelin Throw
 Heli Rantanen
 Qualification — 66.54 m
 Final — 67.94 m (→  Gold Medal)
 Mikaela Ingberg
 Qualification — 60.46 m
 Final — 61.52 m (→ 7th place)
 Taina Uppa
 Qualification — 57.74 m (→ did not advance)

Women's Shot Put 
 Karoliina Lundahl 
 Qualification — 17.14m (→ did not advance)

Women's Long Jump
Heli Koivula
 Qualification — NM (→ did not advance)

Women's Triple Jump
 Heli Koivula
 Qualification — 13.25 m (→ did not advance)

Women's Heptathlon 
 Tiia Hautala
 Final Result — 5887 points (→ 21st place)

Women's Marathon
 Kirsi Rauta — did not finish (→ no ranking)

Women's 10 km Walk
 Sari Essayah — 45:02 (→ 16th place)

Badminton

Men's Singles
Pontus Jäntti
Robert Liljequist

Canoeing

Men's Kayak Singles, 500 metres
Mikko Kolehmainen

Men's Kayak Singles, 1,000 metres
Mikko Kolehmainen

Cycling

Road Competition
Men's Individual Road Race
Joona Laukka
Kari Myyryläinen

Women's Individual Road Race
Tea Vikstedt-Nyman 
 Final — 02:37:06 (→ 34th place)

Women's Individual Time Trial
Tea Vikstedt-Nyman 
 Final — 38:24 (→ 6th place)

Track Competition
Men's Individual Pursuit, 4,000 metres
Jukka Heinikainen

Women's Sprint, 1,000 metres
Mira Kasslin

Women's Points Race
Tea Vikstedt-Nyman

Equestrianism

Individual Mixed Dressage 
Kyra Kyrklund

Fencing

One female fencer represented Finland in 1996.

Women's épée
 Minna Lehtola

Judo

Men's Half-Lightweight
Pasi Lauren

Rhythmic gymnastics

Women's Individual Rhythmic Gymnastics
Katri Kalpala

Rowing

Men's Single Sculls
Tomas Söderblom

Women's Single Sculls
Laila Finska-Bezerra

Sailing

Shooting

Swimming

Men's 50 m Freestyle
 Janne Blomqvist
 Heat — 23.61 (→ did not advance, 37th place)

Men's 100 m Freestyle
 Kalle Varonen
 Heat — 52.00 (→ did not advance, 44th place)

Men's 200 m Freestyle
 Jani Sievinen
 Heat — 1:49.05 
 Swim-off for 8th — 1:48.89 (→ scratched second swim-off)
 Antti Kasvio
 Heat — 1:50.55 (→ did not advance, 18th place)

Men's 100 m Butterfly
 Vesa Hanski
 Heat — 54.73 (→ did not advance, 25th place)

Men's 200 m Butterfly
 Vesa Hanski
 Heat — 1:59.73
 B-Final — 1:59.64 (→ 10th place)

Men's 200 m Individual Medley
 Jani Sievinen
 Heat — 2:01.05
 Final — 2:00.13 (→  Silver Medal)
 Petteri Lehtinen
 Heat — 2:05.51  (→ did not advance, 19th place)

Men's 400 m Individual Medley
 Jani Sievinen
 Heat — 4:23.13
 Final — scratched

Men's 4 × 100 m Freestyle Relay
 Jani Sievinen, Antti Kasvio, Janne Blomqvist, and Kalle Varonen
 Heat — 3:22.99 (→ did not advance, 12th place)

Women's 50 m Freestyle
 Minna Salmela
 Heat — 26.72 (→ did not advance, 34th place)

Women's 100 m Freestyle
 Minna Salmela
 Heat — 57.15 (→ did not advance, 22nd place)

Women's 200 m Freestyle
 Paula Harmokivi
 Heat — 2:03.54 (→ did not advance, 18th place)

Women's 400 m Freestyle
 Paula Harmokivi
 Heat — 4:23.84 (→ did not advance, 33rd place)

Women's 100 m Backstroke
 Anu Koivisto
 Heat — 1:05.26 (→ did not advance, 23rd place)

Women's 200 m Backstroke
 Anu Koivisto
 Heat — 2:19.58 (→ did not advance, 25th place)

Women's 100 m Breaststroke
 Mia Hagman
 Heat — 1:13.01 (→ did not advance, 32nd place)

Women's 200 m Breaststroke
 Mia Hagman
 Heat — 2:36.11 (→ did not advance, 25th place)

Women's 100 m Butterfly
 Marja Pärssinen
 Heat — 1:02.53 (→ did not advance, 22nd place)

Women's 4 × 100 m Freestyle Relay
 Minna Salmela, Paula Harmokivi, Marja Pärssinen, and Marja Heikkilä
 Heat — 3:50.33 (→ did not advance, 16th place)

Women's 4 × 100 m Medley Relay
 Anu Koivisto, Mia Hagman, Marja Pärssinen, and Minna Salmela
 Heat — 4:14.14 (→ did not advance, 14th place)

Weightlifting

Men's Lightweight
 Jouni Grönman

Men's Heavyweight
 Janne Kanerva

Wrestling

Men's Lightweight, Greco-Roman
 Marko Yli-Hannuksela

Men's Welterweight, Greco-Roman
 Marko Asell

Men's Middleweight, Greco-Roman
 Tuomo Karila

Men's Light-Heavyweight, Greco-Roman
 Harri Koskela

Men's Super-Heavyweight, Greco-Roman
 Juha Ahokas

Notes

References

Nations at the 1996 Summer Olympics
1996
S